Narender Ranbir (born 10 July 1989) is an Indian Paralympic javelin thrower competing in F44 events. He is supported by the GoSports Foundation through the Para Champions Programme ahead of his quest to win a medal for India at the 2016 Paralympics in Rio de Janeiro, Brazil.

Early life and background
Narender has had a deformity in his left leg by birth. Initially a runner, Narender had to give up athletics due to chronic back problems. His passion for sport saw him quickly switch to javelin throw.

Career 
After taking to javelin throw, Narender has been consistently performing at the highest level. He finished sixth at the London Paralympics in 2012, after which he narrowly missed out on a medal at the World Championships in Lyon, finishing fourth. Narender's best performance came at the Asian Para Games in 2014 at Incheon, where he clinched the silver medal.

Narender trains without a coach at the Sports Authority of India in Sonipat. He is one of India's top medal prospects at the 2016 Summer Paralympic Games in Rio de Janeiro.

Achievements 
Paralympics

World Championships

References

Living people
1989 births
Paralympic athletes of India
Athletes (track and field) at the 2012 Summer Paralympics
Athletes (track and field) at the 2016 Summer Paralympics
Indian male javelin throwers
Athletes from Haryana